The men's 50 metre rifle three positions event at the 2020 Summer Olympics took place on 2 August 2021 at the Asaka Shooting Range.

Records 
Prior to this competition, the existing world and Olympic records were as follows.

Schedule 
All times are Japan Standard Time (UTC+9)

Results

Qualification

Final

References 

Shooting at the 2020 Summer Olympics
Men's 050m 3 positions 2020
Men's events at the 2020 Summer Olympics